Fujiwara no Ariko (藤原（三条）有子; 1207 – March 2, 1286) also known as Fujiwara no Yushi, Anka Monin (安喜門院) and Ankimon-in was Empress of Japan as the consort of Emperor Go-Horikawa.

She became a Buddhist nun in 1246.

Notes

Fujiwara clan
Japanese empresses
1207 births
1286 deaths